The Vapomobile was an early English  steam car either manufactured or assembled by the Motor Construction Company in Nottingham between 1902 and 1904.  Five, Seven and Twelve horsepower models are known to have been produced with the Twelve horsepower model using an American Mason engine. The two smaller cars had tiller steering.

See also
 List of car manufacturers of the United Kingdom

References
David Burgess Wise, The New Illustrated Encyclopedia of Automobiles.

Defunct motor vehicle manufacturers of England
Steam cars
Companies based in Nottingham